Windham is a town in Windham County, Connecticut,  United States. It contains the former city of Willimantic as well as the boroughs of Windham Center, North Windham, and South Windham. Willimantic, an incorporated city since 1893, was consolidated with the town in 1983. The population was 24,428 at the 2020 census.

History

Prior to the arrival of Europeans, the region was occupied by Algonquian peoples, including the Pequot, Mohegan, Narragansett, and Nipmuck. After the conclusion of the Pequot War in 1638, the Pequots ceased to exist as a tribe; after King Philip's War ended in 1678, the Narragansett and Nipmuck did as well, leaving the Mohegans the only native power in the region. The settlement of Windham was left to settlers by Joshua Uncas, son of Uncas, in a will dated 1675. Settlers moved in, and held their first town meeting on May 18, 1691. The tract was named the town of Windham in May 1692, and was incorporated into Hartford County in fall of 1693.

Starting in the early nineteenth century, the town's center of activity moved from Windham to Willimantic, as the water power available there led to the establishment of factories. First established as a borough in 1833, it was incorporated as a separate city in 1893, then reincorporated into the town of Windham in 1983 as its industry declined.

Sites listed on the National Register of Historic Places

 Dr. Chester Hunt Office – Windham Center Road (added November 6, 1970)
 Forty-Seventh Camp of Rochambeau's Army (added February 23, 2003)
 Fourth Camp of Rochambeau's Army (added February 8, 2003)
 Main Street Historic District (Windham, Connecticut) – 32, 50 and 54 North St. (added August 29, 1992)
 March Route of Rochambeau's Army: Scotland Road – Scotland Road, from intersection with Back Rd. to 80 Scotland Rd. (added July 6, 2003)
 Willimantic Armory – Pleasant Street (added October 12, 1985)
 Windham Center Historic District – state Routes 14 and 203 (added July 4, 1979)

Geography

According to the United States Census Bureau, the town has a total area of 27.9 square miles (72.3 km), of which, 27.1 square miles (70.1 km) of it is land and 0.9 square miles (2.2 km) of it (3.04%) is water.

Climate

Demographics

As of the census of 2000, there were 22,857 people, 8,342 households, and 5,088 families residing in the town. The racial makeup of the town was 74.02% White, 5.06% African American, 0.56% Native American, 1.30% Asian, 0.12% Pacific Islander, 15.16% from other races, and 3.78% from two or more races. Hispanic or Latino of any race were 26.85% of the population.

There were 8,342 households, out of which 30.1% had children under the age of 18 living with them, 39.4% were married couples living together, 16.8% had a female householder with no husband present, and 39.0% were non-families. 29.8% of all households were made up of individuals, and 11.2% had someone living alone who was 65 years of age or older.  The average household size was 2.47 and the average family size was 3.05.

In the town, the population was spread out, with 23.0% under the age of 18, 18.1% from 18 to 24, 27.2% from 25 to 44, 19.1% from 45 to 64, and 12.6% who were 65 years of age or older.  The median age was 31 years. For every 100 females, there were 93.5 males.  For every 100 females age 18 and over, there were 90.0 males.

The median income for a household in the town was $35,087, and the median income for a family was $42,023. Males had a median income of $32,742 versus $25,703 for females. The per capita income for the town was $16,978.  About 12.7% of families and 17.5% of the population were below the poverty line, including 23.9% of those under age 18 and 9.6% of those age 65 or over.

Education

Public Schools
 Windham Early Childhood Center 
 Natchaug School
 North Windham School 
 W.B. Sweeney School 
 Windham Center School 
 Windham Middle School 
 Windham High School
 Windham Technical High School

Magnet Schools
 Charles H. Barrows STEM Academy

Private Schools
 St Mary-St Joseph School

Transportation 

Route 32 runs through South Windham and north-western Willimantic. Route 66 goes east to west from North Windham to Columbia. Route 14 serves Willimantic to Windham Center. Route 203 severs the eastern section of town from North Windham to South Windham. Route 195 goes from Willimantic to Mansfield eventually going to the University of Connecticut. Route 289 starts in southern Willimantic and shortly after going into Lebanon to Route 87. US 6 bypasses Willimantic and serves North Windham. Bus service is available around the town seven days a week. Windham Airport is a general aviation airport located in North Windham. Bradley International Airport (BDL) in Windsor Locks is the closest major commercial airport. There is no passenger train service, but a freight train stop is found in Willimantic for the Providence and Worcester Railroad. Bus service is provided by the Windham Region Transit District, and Connecticut Transit express bus route 918.

Notable people

 George Hewitt Cushman (1814–1876), engraver and painter of miniature paintings and portraits
 Eliphalet Dyer (1721–1807), a lawyer, jurist, and delegate for Connecticut to the Continental Congress, was born in town
 Benjamin Hanks (1755–1824), goldsmith, instrument maker, and first maker of bronze cannons and church bells in America
 William Hebard (1800–1875), a United States representative from Vermont was born in town
 Samuel Huntington (1731–1796), signed the Declaration of Independence and the Articles of Confederation; was 18th Governor of Connecticut
 Jerusha Bingham Kirkland (1743–1788), missionary; niece of Eleazar Wheelock
 Gardiner Means (1896–1988), economist
 Mary A. Ripley (1831–1893), author, lecturer, teacher
 Eleazar Wheelock (1711–1779), a Congregational minister, orator, educator, and founder of Dartmouth College, was born in town

References

External links

 Town of Windham, Connecticut

 
Towns in Windham County, Connecticut
Towns in Connecticut